The Cat River is a  tributary of the Crow Wing River in the U.S. state of Minnesota. It is part of the Mississippi River drainage basin.

Cat River was named for the cougars which were once common in the area.

See also
List of rivers of Minnesota

References

Minnesota Watersheds
USGS Hydrologic Unit Map - State of Minnesota (1974)

Rivers of Wadena County, Minnesota
Rivers of Minnesota
Tributaries of the Mississippi River